Nduka Awazie (born 4 April 1981) is a Nigerian athlete and Olympic medalist and the 400 meters world Junior Champion. He won the world junior title at the 8th IAAF World Junior Championship held in 1998 Annecy, France. He attended Eastern Michigan University.

Awazie was part of the Nigerian team that won the silver medal in the 4 x 400 metres relay at the 2000 Olympics.

The Nigerian team finished second behind the US team. The US team has since been formally disqualified from the 4x400 meters relay event at the 2000 Olympics by the International Olympic Committee, due to team member Antonio Pettigrew's use of illegal performance-enhancing drugs while competing in Sydney.

On 21 July 2012, the 2000 Olympics 4 × 400 m relay medals were reallocated after the USA team was stripped of the gold medal, meaning Awazie and Nigeria are the gold medalists.

References

External links
 
 iaaf-biographies

1981 births
Living people
Nigerian male sprinters
Athletes (track and field) at the 2000 Summer Olympics
Olympic athletes of Nigeria
Eastern Michigan Eagles men's track and field athletes
Medalists at the 2000 Summer Olympics
Olympic gold medalists for Nigeria
Olympic gold medalists in athletics (track and field)